is a railway station in the city of Kurihara, Miyagi, Japan, operated by the East Japan Railway Company (JR East).

Lines

Station layout
The elevated station has two side platforms serving two tracks. The platforms are equipped with platform screen doors. The station has a "Midori no Madoguchi" staffed ticket office.

Platforms

History
The station opened on 10 March 1990.

Passenger statistics
In fiscal 2018, the station was used by an average of 1,048 passengers daily (boarding passengers only).

Surrounding area 

Shiwahime Post Office
Former Shiwahime town hall

Buses
Gureen Kankō Bus
For Ishikoshi Station via Wakayanagi
For Tsukidate
Higashi-Nihon Kyūkō Bus
For Sendai Station

See also
 List of railway stations in Japan

References

External links
   

Railway stations in Japan opened in 1990
Tōhoku Shinkansen
Railway stations in Miyagi Prefecture
Kurihara, Miyagi